Our Lady Academy (OLA) is a private, Roman Catholic, all-girls high school in Bay St. Louis, Mississippi.  It is located in the Roman Catholic Diocese of Biloxi. It is the only all-female Catholic school in Mississippi.

Background
St. Joseph Academy closed after it was severely damaged by Hurricane Betsy in 1965. There was talk of reopening St. Joseph Academy until Hurricane Camille hit in 1969.

Our Lady Academy is an exceptional school that excels in education, standardized test scores, and athletics.  The relatively small campus, consisting of only a few buildings and a gym, is located on the beach of Bay St. Louis.  OLA's mascot is the Crescent and the teams are known as "The Crescents."  The Our Lady Academy soccer team has won 7 state titles in recent years for the 1A/2A/3A division. The volleyball team has many state titles to their name as well.

Our Lady Academy was severely damaged by Hurricane Katrina. Classes resumed two months after the storm, sharing resources with nearby all-boys Saint Stanislaus College.  The motto for the two schools after Hurricane Katrina was "Two Schools, One Spirit."

Notes and references

External links
 School Website

Educational institutions established in 1971
Girls' schools in Mississippi
Private middle schools in Mississippi
Roman Catholic Diocese of Biloxi
Catholic secondary schools in Mississippi
Schools in Hancock County, Mississippi